Alfred Vohrer (29 December 1914 – 3 February 1986) was a German film director and actor. He directed 48 films between 1958 and 1984. His 1969 film Seven Days Grace was entered into the 6th Moscow International Film Festival. His 1972 film Tears of Blood was entered into the 8th Moscow International Film Festival. His 1974 film Only the Wind Knows the Answer was entered into the 9th Moscow International Film Festival.

Selected filmography

Dirty Angel (1958) 
 My Ninety Nine Brides (1958)
 Crime After School (1959)
  (1960)
 The Dead Eyes of London (1961)
 Our House in Cameroon (1961)
 The Door with Seven Locks (1962)
 The Inn on the River (1962)
 The Squeaker (1963)
 The Indian Scarf (1963)
 An Alibi for Death (1963)
 Waiting Room to the Beyond (1964)
 Der Hexer (1964)
 Among Vultures (1964)
 Neues vom Hexer (1965)
 Old Surehand (1965)
 Long Legs, Long Fingers (1966)
  The Hunchback of Soho (1966)
 Winnetou and Old Firehand (1966)
 Creature with the Blue Hand (1967)
 The Monk with the Whip (1967)
 The Hound of Blackwood Castle (1968)
 The Zombie Walks (1968)
 The Gorilla of Soho (1968)
 The Man with the Glass Eye (1969)
 Seven Days Grace (1969)
  (1969)
 The Sex Nest (1970)
  (1970)
 Und Jimmy ging zum Regenbogen (1971)
 Love Is Only a Word (1971)
 The Stuff That Dreams Are Made Of (1972)
 Tears of Blood (1972)
 All People Will Be Brothers (1973)
  (1973)
 Three Men in the Snow (1974)
  (1974)
 Only the Wind Knows the Answer (1974)
 Crime After School (1975)
  (1975)
 Derrick (1975–1986, TV series, 28 episodes)
 Everyone Dies Alone (1976)
  (1976)
 Silence in the Forest (1976)
 The Old Fox (1977–1981, TV series, 12 episodes)
 Das Traumschiff (1983–1984, TV series, 6 episodes)
 Weißblaue Geschichten (1984–1986, TV series, 6 episodes)
 The Black Forest Clinic (1985, TV series, 12 episodes)

References

External links

1914 births
1986 deaths
Film people from Stuttgart